Buzuk may refer to:

 Buzuk, the Albanian word for Bouzouki, a chordophone used in folk music
 Andrija Buzuk, 1891–1894, provincial superior of the Franciscan province Bosna Argentina

See also 
Buzuq